Bojan Janić ( born 11 March 1982 in Leskovac, SR Serbia, Yugoslavia) is a Serbian volleyball player and former captain of the Serbia national team. He was a member of the national team at the 2008 Summer Olympics in Beijing and 2012 Summer Olympics in London.

Career 
 1996-02   OK Crvena Zvezda
 2002-03   OK Vojvodina
 2003-04   Estense 4 Torri Ferrara
 2004-05   Tonno Calipo Vibo Valentina
 2005-06   Unicaja Almeria
 2006-07   Codyeco S.Croce
 2007-08   Blu Volley Verona
 2008-09   Trefl Gdańsk
 2009-11   Yaroslavich Yaroslavl
 2011-12   Fakel, Novy Urengoy
 2012-13   Galatasaray
 2013-14   Tang Dynasty Hotel Shanghai
 2014-  C.V.M. Tomis Constanța

Personal
Besides his native Serbian, Bojan is fluent in English, Russian and Italian. He married Serbian actress Nada Macanković.

References

External links
 London 2012 profile at the International Volleyball Federation
 BBC Sport profile
 
 
 

Living people
1982 births
Sportspeople from Leskovac
Serbian men's volleyball players
Olympic volleyball players of Serbia
Volleyball players at the 2008 Summer Olympics
Volleyball players at the 2012 Summer Olympics
Expatriate volleyball players in Romania
Serbian expatriate sportspeople in Italy
Serbian expatriate sportspeople in Spain
Serbian expatriate sportspeople in Poland
Serbian expatriate sportspeople in Russia
Serbian expatriate sportspeople in Turkey
Serbian expatriate sportspeople in China
Serbian expatriate sportspeople in Romania
Expatriate volleyball players in China
Mediterranean Games bronze medalists for Serbia
Competitors at the 2005 Mediterranean Games
Mediterranean Games medalists in volleyball
Expatriate volleyball players in Italy
Expatriate volleyball players in Spain
Expatriate volleyball players in Poland
Expatriate volleyball players in Russia
Expatriate volleyball players in Turkey
Serbian expatriate sportspeople in France
Expatriate volleyball players in France